"In Love with a DJ" (also known as "Turn It Up" or "Crank It Up") is a 2010 song by the singer CeCe Peniston and producer Ron Carroll.

Carroll collaborated with Peniston already on her previous singles, "My Boo" in 2000, and "I'm Feelin' U" in 2007 (which he also co-wrote). "In Love with a DJ", their house/groove composition in common, was the first release of the producer's own independent record label called Electricity Records, which is a part of One Entertainment, which has a major distribution deal with Universal. In 2011, the singer teamed up again with the producer to record another house composition, "Make Me Say Oh", which appeared on a various artists compilation Miami 2011.

One week after its official digital release in July 2010, the single was classified by major UK DJs as number twenty in the DMS's Buzz chart (Issue 385), and in September, the House Moguls' remix topped the TraxSource download chart.

Credits and personnel
 CeCe Peniston - lead vocal, writer
 Ron Carroll - writer, remix, producer
 Ajdin Begoviç - remix
 Bill Basil - remix
 Gus Calderone - remix
 Laurent Scimeca - remix
 Stéphane Bonan - remix

Track listing and format
 MD, US, #ELRC001
 "In Love with a DJ (Ron Carroll's Original Mix)" -  7:50
 "In Love with a DJ (Baggi Begoviç Remix)" - 8:11
 "In Love with a DJ (The House Moguls Remix)" - 8:33
 "In Love with a DJ (Swingfield Remix)" - 7:22

2014 version

In 2014, the song was released under an alternate title, "Turn It Up". Apart from Baggi Begoviç, the track was in addition remixed by Lizzie Curious, and issued on September 19, 2014 through Vamos Music.

Additional credits
 Lizzie Taylor-Allee  - remix

Track listings and formats
 MD, EU & US, #VAM 254
 "Turn It Up (Baggi’s Hand Bag House Mix)" -  8:11

 MD, EU & US, #VAM 261
 "Turn It Up (Lizzie Curious Remix)" -  7:12

References

General

 Specific

External links
 
 

2010 singles
CeCe Peniston songs
Songs written by CeCe Peniston
Songs written by Ron Carroll
2010 songs